The Tokyo International Women's Marathon was a marathon for female elite runners held in Tokyo from 1979 until 2008 in November.

It was first held in November 1979, and this race was the first women's marathon officially sanctioned by the International Amateur Athletic Federation (IAAF). After Adriaan Paulen, the IAAF president, watched this event, he announced his support for the women's Marathon to be included in the Olympic Games.

After the 30th edition the organisers (Japan Association of Athletics Federations (JAAF), Asahi Shimbun and TV Asahi) discontinued the race, because the new Tokyo Marathon held since 2007 is open for general runners of both sexes and Metropolitan Police Department deemed it difficult to care for two different city marathons within one year.

The place of the Tokyo Women's Marathon in the Japanese race calendar was taken by the Yokohama Women's Marathon whose first edition was held on November 15, 2009.

Winners 
Key:

References 

Winners list
Tokyo Women's Marathon at arrs.run

External links 
 Official Website (English version)
 Tokyo Women's Marathon at marathoninfo.free.fr

Sports competitions in Tokyo
Recurring sporting events established in 1979
Recurring sporting events disestablished in 2008
1979 establishments in Japan
2008 disestablishments in Japan
Women's marathons in Japan
Athletics in Tokyo
Defunct athletics competitions
Defunct sports competitions in Japan
Women in Tokyo